Jean-Jacques Béchio (22 August 1949 – 12 February 2018) was an Ivorian politician. A member of the Attie ethnic group, he came from the student trade union milieu where he started his career.

References

1949 births
2018 deaths
Ivorian politicians
People from Grand-Bassam